Sukriti Kakar (born 8 May 1995) is an Indian singer born in New Delhi. Kakar rose to prominence after recording title song from the film Boss composed by Meet Bros which featured Yo Yo Honey Singh. Since then she has sung many songs most notably, "Kar Gayi Chull" from Kapoor & Sons which became a huge hit.

Life and career

1995–2011: Early life 
Kakar studied Arts at Mithibai College and was a B.M.M student at R.D. National College. Since the very beginning, Kakar has grown up in a musical environment. Her mom has trained in Hindustani classical music for a very long time and was a music teacher at Balbharti Public School in Delhi for a long time. Her elder sister Akriti Kakar is also a playback singer and her twin sister Prakriti Kakar, who is also a playback singer, realised her love for music at the age of 8 and started her career with "Katra Katra" in Alone (2015).

2012 – 2020: Bollywood releases 
Kakar began her career with the title song of Boss (2013), which was composed by Meet Bros Anjjan. Her next song was from the movie Hum Hai Raahi Car Ke (2013) title track. She next appeared in the track "Goti Song" from the movie Nasha (2013) with Akshay Deodhar and her twin sister Prakriti Kakar. Kakar's performance in Mujhse Hogi Shurvaat was released by "I Paid a Bribe" and The Shankar Mahadevan Academy as an initiative to tackle corruption. Apart from Kakar, the song is rendered by Mahadevan, Prakriti Kakar and Chetan Naik. The song was nominated in the best activist anthem category of Honesty Oscars 2014.

In June 2015, she bagged her first hit, "Pheli Baar" from the movie Dil Dhadakne Do, which was a massive hit which crossed over 4 million views on YouTube. It was then she was offered to sing for the song "Jungli Peeke Tight Hai"  from Kis Kisko Pyaar Karoon (2015) starred Kapil Sharma. A year later in 2016, she lent her voice for Kapoor & Sons  for the song "Kar Gayi Chull" along with Badshah. In 2017, she sang "Maine Tujhko Dekha" from Golmaal Again composed by Amaal Malik which itself was a remake from the 1997 film Ishq, composed by Anu Malik.

2021 – Present: Pop music 
Beside filmy songs, Kakar has sung some non-filmy songs. She along with her sister, Prakriti Kakar has sung "Mafiyan", "Kehndi Haan Kehndi Naa", "Majnu" and many more.

In September 2021, the duo sisters along with Amaal Mallik collaborated with Dua Lipa for Indian remix version of Levitating (song), which became a global hit.

Media 
In March 2021, Sukriti along with her sister Prakriti Kakar featured at No. 2 position on the global Billboard charts for their song "Naari". Later that year in October, Kakar along with Prakriti Kakar featured at the Times Square in New York City.

Discography

Film songs

Non-film songs

Awards and achievements 
 Nomination for 'Upcoming Female Vocalist' for her song,"Pehli Baar" (Dil Dhadakne Do) at Mirchi Music Awards in 2015.
 Sukriti has been featured on a devotional Album Ganaraj Adhiraj in 2014 and sang two tracks on it. The album bagged a GiMA in 2012.
 Featured on the MTV Unplugged with Mika Singh.
 Featured on the T-Series MixTape with Shaan.

References

External links 

 

21st-century Indian women singers
21st-century Indian singers
Bollywood playback singers
Hindi-language singers
Living people
1995 births